The LG Vu (CU915/CU920) is a touchscreen feature phone made by LG. It was released in May, 2008, almost a year after the iPhone and about four months before the first Android phone. The phone is on the AT&T network and the CU920 is capable of mobile TV. In Canada, a variant was sold under the model name TU915 by Rogers and Fido.

Interface
Most of the features on the Vu are accessed through its 3" diagonal touch screen. The phone has Call, Clear and End buttons below the screen, a volume rocker, Lock/Unlock button, and camera button along the right side. The Vu also contains haptic feedback when the touch screen is touched. Like the LG Prada, a fish or butterfly follows the touch of the user on the screen.

User Modification
In addition to the general interface, users have the ability to modify the visual interface by downloading themes. The user interface may be altered to visually mimic other operating systems, such as android or iOS.

References

External links
LG Electronics-LG Official Website
LG-Vu.com - A Forum about LG Vu
LG Vu at WikiSpecs
MobileTechReview.com - Detailed phone review

CU915 CU920
Portable media players